The 2014 Newcastle-under-Lyme Borough Council election took place on 22 May 2014 to elect members of Newcastle-under-Lyme Borough Council in England. This was on the same day as other local elections.

Election result

References

2014 English local elections
2014
2010s in Staffordshire